Something Warm is a live album by the Oscar Peterson Trio, recorded at the London House jazz club in Chicago. The sessions were in 1961, but the album was initially released as Verve V/V6-8681 in 1967. 

Three other Oscar Peterson Trio albums were also released featuring music from the London House concerts: The Trio, The Sound of the Trio, and Put On a Happy Face. The complete  sessions were released in 1996 as The London House Sessions.

Track listing
Side One
"There Is No Greater Love" (Isham Jones, Marty Symes)
"I Remember Clifford" (Benny Golson)
"Autumn Leaves" (Jacques Prévert, Joseph Kosma, Johnny Mercer)  
Side Two  
  "Blues for Big Scotia" (Oscar Peterson)
"Swamp Fire" (Harold Mooney)
"I Love You" (Cole Porter)

Personnel
Oscar Peterson – piano
Ray Brown – double bass
Ed Thigpen – drums

Chart positions

References

1967 live albums
Oscar Peterson live albums
Albums recorded at The London House, Chicago
Verve Records live albums
Albums produced by Norman Granz